Georges Delvallée (born 15 March 1937 at Fourmies, Nord is a French organist.

A student of Alfred Cortot, Delvallée prepared his licence for concert at the École normale de musique de Paris. In addition to the piano, he studied harmony, composition with Henri Challan. Following the advice of Marcel Dupré, André Marchal and Marie-Louise Girod, he decided to devote himself to pipe organ.

He made a great career dedicated to organ symphonies, specializing in particular in the work of Charles Tournemire. He is an academic at the École normale de musique de Paris and teaches at conservatories in the Paris region.

Discography 
 Musique d’orgue contemporaine - Daniel-Lesur, Jean-Jacques Werner, Božidar Kantušer (Sonotec -  OC 8609) - 1968
 Charles Tournemire - Sept Chorals-Poèmes pour les sept paroles du Christ, op. 67 (Arion - ARN 68 158 - 1 CD) - 1970
 Grandes toccatas et carillons pour orgue - Bach, Gigout, Dupré, Tournemire, Vierne, Widor, Boëllman, Werner, Duruflé (reissue Arion ARN 68076 - 1 CD) - 1972
 Saqueboute, trombone et orgue aux XVIIe et XVIIIe - Marcello, Vivaldi, Corelli, Frescobaldi - Jean-Pierre Mathieu, Saqueboute et trombone (Arion - ARN 34949) - 1974
 Violon et orgue au XVIIIe siècle - Corelli, Leclair, Haendel, Vitali - Annie Jodry, violin (Arion - ARN 37161) - 1975
 Les orgues de Masevaux - Lucchinetti, Guami, Blanco, Satie, Langlais - Marie-Louise Jaquet, orgue (Arion - ARN 38486) - 1978
 L'Orgue mystique: 6 offices / Charles Tournemire - , Bernard Foccroulle, George Delvallée, Bernard Heiniger, organ (Erato Records ERA9239 / 40) - 1981
 Louis Couperin Pièces pour clavier (Arion - ARN 38582) - 1981
 Robert Schumann L'intégrale de l’œuvre pour orgue ou piano pédalier (REM - 10969) - 1983
 Violin - Organ - Jean-Jacques Werner, Pierre Ancelin - Annie Jodry, violon (REM - 10966) - 1983
 Noëls anciens français - Daquin, Lebègue, Dornel, Dandrieu, Balbastre, Corrette (REM - 11139) - 1986 - reissue Azulejaria 2016
 Charles Tournemire - Douze Préludes-Poèmes, Poème mystique & autres pièces pour piano (Accord - 204 772 - 2 CD) - 1989 and 1990
 Charles Tournemire - Les quatre symphonies pour orgue (Accord - 243 312 - 1 CD) -1990
 Charles Tournemire - Suite évocatrice Op.74, Sei Fioretti, Fantaisie symphonique op. 64 et Poème III Op.59 (Accord - 243 812 - 1 CD) - 1992
 Louis Vierne - Intégrale de l'œuvre pour piano (Arion - ARN 68 270 & 312 - 2 CD) - 1994 and 1995
 Charles Tournemire - L'Orgue mystique "Cycle de Noël" (Accord - 205 352 - 3 CD) - 1996
 Charles Tournemire - L'Orgue mystique "Cycle de Pâques" (Accord - 206 002 - 3 CD) - 1997
 Charles Tournemire - L'Orgue mystique "Cycle après la Pentecôte" 1st part (Accord - 206 632 - 3 CD) - 1999
 Charles Tournemire - L'Orgue mystique "Cycle après la Pentecôte" 2nd part (Accord - 461 641-2 - 3 CD) - 2000
 Charles Tournemire - Sept Chorals-Poèmes pour les sept paroles du Christ, op. 67 (Accord - 472 982-2 - 1 CD) - 2003
 Jehan Alain - Intégrale de l'œuvre pour piano (Triton - TRI 331175 - 1 CD) - 2011
 Robert Schumann - L'intégrale de l’œuvre pour orgue ou piano pédalier(Azulejaria - 6139 - 2 CD) reissued - 2015
 Jean-Jacques Werner Œuvres pour orgueF / Božidar Kantušer - Intégrale de l’œuvre pour orgue (Azulejaria - 6971 - 2 CD) part reissue / part original recording - 2016 
 Rhapsodie bretonne - musique française pour orgue inspirée des chants populaires et des cantiques bretons - Camille Saint-Saëns, Charles Tournemire, Paul Le Flem, Joseph-Guy Ropartz, Gaston Litaize, Jean Langlais (Azulejaria - 8102 - 1 CD) - 2017

External links 
 Georges Delvallée on France Orgue
 Georges DELVALLEE , orgue on Les artistes d'Éol
 Georges Delvallée on AllMusic
 Georges Delvallée on Discogs
 YouTube Georges Delvallée joue Gershwin sur l'orgue numérique Allen d'Écouis.

École Normale de Musique de Paris alumni
French classical organists
French male organists
French music educators
1937 births
People from Nord (French department)
Living people
21st-century organists
21st-century French male musicians
Male classical organists